Group B of the 2010 Fed Cup Americas Zone Group II was one of two pools in the Americas Zone Group II of the 2010 Fed Cup. Five teams competed in a round robin competition, with the teams proceeding to their respective sections of the play-offs: the top two teams played for advancement to the 2011 Group I.

Guatemala vs. Panama

Mexico vs. Bermuda

Guatemala vs. Mexico

Peru vs. Panama

Guatemala vs. Peru

Panama vs. Bermuda

Mexico vs. Panama

Peru vs. Bermuda

Mexico vs. Peru

Guatemala vs. Bermuda

See also
 Fed Cup structure

References

External links
 Fed Cup website

2010 Fed Cup Americas Zone